Allocasuarina verticillata, commonly known as drooping she-oak or drooping sheoak, is a nitrogen fixing native tree of southeastern Australia.

Originally collected in Tasmania and described as Casuarina verticillata by French naturalist Jean-Baptiste Lamarck in 1786, it was moved to its current genus in 1982 by Australian botanist Lawrie Johnson.

The 1889 book The Useful Native Plants of Australia records common names of the plant included "Shingle Oak," "Coast She-oak," " River Oak," " Salt-water Swamp Oak" and was called "Worgnal" by the Indigenous people of the Richmond and Clarence River areas of New South Wales. It also records that, "In cases of severe thirst, great relief may be obtained from chewing the foliage of this and other species, which, being of an acid nature, produces a flow of saliva—a fact well-known to bushmen who have traversed waterless portions of the country. This acid is closely allied to citric acid, and may prove identical with it. Children chew the young cones, which they call 'oak apples'."

It grows as a small tree with a rounded habit, reaching 4–10 metres (12–35 ft) in height.

The species occurs in Australian Capital Territory, New South Wales, South Australia, Tasmania, and Victoria.

On Kangaroo Island, it is the preferred food item of the Glossy Black Cockatoo, which holds the cones in its foot and shreds them with its powerful bill before removing the seeds with its tongue.

Description
Allocasuarina verticillata is a dioecious tree from 4 to 10 m tall with woody penultimate branchlets. The bark is fissured and the branchlets droop. The branchlets are up to 40 cm long, with internodes being from 10 to 40 mm long and  0.7–1.5 mm in diameter, broader at the end near teeth, and generally densely pubescent in the furrows, with ribs slightly rounded and a minutely roughened keel. Leaves are reduced to small teeth at the end of nodes. The teeth (8–)9–13, are spreading, not overlapping and about 1 mm long. Male spikes are from 3–12 cm long, with 2–4 whorls per cm and anthers 1–2.5 mm long. Female inflorescence are often located on older branches (towards the inner of the tree). Each female flower consist of one ovary (with two fused carpels, although only one fully develops) and two styles after fertilisation. The styles are red in colour, giving the overall inflorescence a red colour. The whole structure then becomes woody, developing into a cone. The cones are cylindrical to barrel-shaped, longer than broad, sessile or on peduncle to 10 mm long with the body of the cone being 20–50 mm long and 17–30 mm in diameter. The valves are in several rows, sometimes extending well beyond cone body, broadly acute to acute, and often pointed. The winged seeds are from 7 to 12 mm long and very dark brown. The plant flowers all year round.

References

External links

  Occurrence data for Allocasuarina verticillata from The Australasian Virtual Herbarium

verticillata
Fagales of Australia
Trees of Australia
Flora of the Australian Capital Territory
Flora of New South Wales
Flora of South Australia
Flora of Tasmania
Flora of Victoria (Australia)
Dioecious plants